Walter Scott Tattersall (4 September 1888 – 30 December 1968) was an English professional footballer who played for Mansfield Wesleyans, Warsop United, Moores Athletic (Shirebrook), Chesterfield Town, Mansfield Mechanics, Watford, Tottenham Hotspur, Shirebrook, Welbeck Colliery and Sutton Junction.

Football career 
Tattersall played for Non-league sides Mansfield Wesleyans, Warsop United and Moores Athletic before joining Chesterfield in 1907 where he appeared in three matches. He went on to play for Mansfield Mechanics and later Watford, for whom he played 75 times in all competitions. Watford sold winger Tattersall and wing half Arthur Grimsdell to Tottenham Hotspur in 1912, for a combined fee of £500. He scored five goals in 47 matches in all competitions for the Lilywhites. After leaving White Hart Lane, Tattersall had spells at Shirebrook, Welbeck Colliery and finally Sutton Junction.

He died in his hometown of Warsop, Nottinghamshire, aged 80.

References 

1888 births
1968 deaths
People from Warsop
Footballers from Nottinghamshire
English footballers
Association football outside forwards
Mansfield Town F.C. players
Chesterfield F.C. players
Mansfield Mechanics F.C. players
Watford F.C. players
Tottenham Hotspur F.C. players
Shirebrook Miners Welfare F.C. players
Welbeck Welfare F.C. players
Sutton Junction F.C. players
English Football League players